The Davao Philippines Temple is a temple of the Church of Jesus Christ of Latter-day Saints (LDS Church) under construction in Davao City, Davao del Sur, Philippines.

History
In 1961, Gordon B. Hinckley and a small gathering of members at the Manila American Cemetery marked the beginning of the LDS Church in the Philippines. With more than 800,000 members in the country, the Philippines has the fourth largest membership in the world after the United States, Mexico and Brazil.

The Davao Philippines Temple was announced by church President Russell M. Nelson on October 7, 2018. The temple will be a The two-story, 18,450-square-foot building with a tall, tapering spire over the main entrance, and a patron housing facility behind the building.

The groundbreaking ceremony for the Davao Philippines Temple on November 14, 2020, under the direction of Elder Taniela B. Wakolo, president of the Philippines Area.
The Davao Philippines Temple will be the fifth LDS temple built in the Philippines, following the Manila (1984), Cebu City (2010), Urdaneta (estimated for late 2022), and Alabang (estimated for 2023) temples. Two more temples were announced in 2018 and 2019, which are the Cagayan de Oro and Bacolod temples, but no dates have been set for groundbreaking.

See also

 The Church of Jesus Christ of Latter-day Saints in the Philippines
 Comparison of temples of The Church of Jesus Christ of Latter-day Saints
 List of temples of The Church of Jesus Christ of Latter-day Saints
 List of temples of The Church of Jesus Christ of Latter-day Saints by geographic region
 Religion in the Philippines
 Temple architecture (Latter-day Saints)

References

External links
Alabang Philippines Temple Groundbreaking announcement
Alabang Philippines Temple at ChurchofJesusChristTemples.org

Religious buildings and structures in the Philippines
Proposed religious buildings and structures of the Church of Jesus Christ of Latter-day Saints
Temples (LDS Church) in the Philippines
The Church of Jesus Christ of Latter-day Saints in the Philippines
21st-century Latter Day Saint temples
Buildings and structures in Davao City
Churches in Davao del Sur